Joaquim Miranda (7 September 1950 – 17 June 2006) was a Portuguese economist and politician, a former member of the Portuguese Parliament and of the European Parliament. He was born in Portalegre, in the southern region of Alentejo.

Joaquim Miranda was a member of the Portuguese Communist Party since the 1970s, and was elected to several political jobs. Between 1979 and 1985, he was an alderman in the Municipal Chamber of his hometown, Portalegre. Between 1980 and 1986, he was also a member of the Portuguese Parliament.

Inside the Portuguese Communist Party, Miranda was a member of the Central Committee and of the Regional Committee of Portalegre. In his last years, he left the Central Committee and became a member of the reformist group Renovação Comunista, which criticizes the Party's political orientation.

Tasks in the European Parliament

When Portugal joined the European Union, in 1986, the Communist Party included his name in the list of the Portuguese representatives in the European Parliament. In July of the next year, the first Portuguese European Parliament election was held and Miranda was among the three MEPs elected by the Unitary Democratic Coalition, where the Portuguese Communist Party was included. He continued to be elected in the subsequent elections, and was a member of the European Parliament until 2004, when he resigned due to health problems. There, Miranda was a vice-chairman of the European United Left–Nordic Green Left group, and the chairman of the Committee on Development and Cooperation between 1999 and 2004.

External links
 Personal information at the official website of the European Parliament
 Obituary in the online edition of Público

1950 births
2006 deaths
Portuguese Communist Party politicians
MEPs for Portugal 1987–1989
MEPs for Portugal 1989–1994
MEPs for Portugal 1994–1999
MEPs for Portugal 1999–2004
Portuguese Communist Party MEPs
People from Portalegre, Portugal
Members of the Assembly of the Republic (Portugal)